RIAT may refer to:

Royal International Air Tattoo (RIAT), the world's largest military air show
Research Institute for Arts and Technology (RIAT), an Austrian scientific organization